Accident is a 1976 Romanian thriller film directed by Sergiu Nicolaescu.

Cast
In alphabetical order
 Vladimir Găitan
 Emil Hossu
 Dan Ivănesei
 Ernest Maftei
 Ștefan Mihăilescu-Brăila
 George Mihăiță
 Sergiu Nicolaescu
 Amza Pellea
 
 Colea Răutu
 Virginia Rogin

References

External links
 

1976 films
1970s thriller films
Romanian thriller films
1970s Romanian-language films
Films directed by Sergiu Nicolaescu
1970s road movies